"Lujon" (also known as "Slow Hot Wind") is a musical piece by Henry Mancini.

Background
Its name comes from the lujon percussion instrument heard on the recording.

Henry Mancini recording
It appeared on his 1961 album Mr. Lucky Goes Latin, but was an original piece of music that had nothing to do with the Mr. Lucky television program. It was included in the soundtracks for the films The Big Lebowski, Sexy Beast, W.E., and Two Lovers. 
Mancini would later record a jazz/swing version of "Slow Hot Wind" and include it on his 1975 album Symphonic Soul. The song would eventually reach the #38 spot on the Adult Contemporary list in 1976.

Other versions 
 With lyrics by Norman Gimbel, titled as "Slow Hot Wind" (or "A Slow Hot Wind"), the song was recorded by Johnny Hartman (1964 album The Voice That Is!), Sarah Vaughan (1965 album Sarah Vaughan Sings the Mancini Songbook), Sérgio Mendes & Brazil '66 (1966 album Herb Alpert Presents), Roseanna Vitro (1991 album Reaching for the Moon), Julee Cruise (2002 album The Art of Being a Girl) and others.
 The song was remixed as "Ocean Beach" by Black Mighty Orchestra on the compilation album Chilled 1991–2008.
 "Lujon" is featured in the 1996 album Sacrebleu by Dimitri from Paris, Track 19, renamed "Epilogue".
 Belgian trip hop band Hooverphonic recorded a version of the song overlaid with vocals, "No More Sweet Music". from the 2005 eponymous album.
 "Lujon" was recorded by Les Deux Love Orchestra and appears on the album, King Kong (2008). The Les Deux Love Orchestra features members of Henry Mancini's original orchestra.

In popular culture 
 "Lujon" appeared in the 1998 movie The Big Lebowski where lead character Jeff "The Dude" Lebowski was enticed by porn producer Jackie Treehorn to go after Bunny Lebowski for the money Treehorn loaned her. The song played in Treehorn's bachelor pad while he was drugging The Dude.
 "Lujon" appeared in the 2000 movie Sexy Beast where lead character Gal, in a dream-like sequence, begins floating into the loving embrace of his wife above his beloved pool.
 "Lujon" appeared in the 2008 movie Two Lovers. It is a recurrent theme in a whole part of the movie where the main character goes to a restaurant with the woman he likes.
 "Lujon" appears in the 2004 movie “Never Die Alone” starring DMX in the scene in which he goes to California and is sitting by the pool and meets an actress.
 The DJ Cam's 2001 downtempo album Honeymoon and in 2011 it appeared in Madonna's W.E. movie.
 "Lujon" appears in Ron Howard's 2016 Beatles documentary Eight Days a Week: The Touring Years to introduce the suave and urbane manager, Brian Epstein.
 DJ and producer Nightmares on Wax sampled "Lujon" during his popular London Boiler Room set in 2013.
 R&B singer Amber Mark sampled "Lujon" on her 2020 single, "Generous."
 American rapper Tyler, the Creator sampled "Slow Hot Wind" performed by Penny Goodwin on his song "Hot Wind Blows" for his 2021 album, Call Me If You Get Lost.

References 

Songs with music by Henry Mancini
Songs with lyrics by Norman Gimbel